In number theory, a congruence of squares is a congruence commonly used in integer factorization algorithms.

Derivation
Given a positive integer n, Fermat's factorization method relies on finding numbers x and y satisfying the equality

We can then factor n = x2 − y2 = (x + y)(x − y). This algorithm is slow in practice because we need to search many such numbers, and only a few satisfy the equation. However, n may also be factored if we can satisfy the weaker congruence of squares condition:

From here we easily deduce

This means that n divides the product (x + y)(x − y). Thus (x + y) and (x − y) each contain factors of n, but those factors can be trivial. In this case we need to find another x and y. Computing the greatest common divisors of (x + y, n) and of (x − y, n) will give us these factors; this can be done quickly using the Euclidean algorithm.

Congruences of squares are extremely useful in integer factorization algorithms and are extensively used in, for example, the quadratic sieve, general number field sieve, continued fraction factorization, and Dixon's factorization. Conversely, because finding square roots modulo a composite number turns out to be probabilistic polynomial-time equivalent to factoring that number, any integer factorization algorithm can be used efficiently to identify a congruence of squares.

Further generalizations
It is also possible to use factor bases to help find congruences of squares more quickly.

Examples

Factorize 35
We take n = 35 and find that 

. 

We thus factor as

Factorize 1649
Using n = 1649, as an example of finding a congruence of squares built up from the products of non-squares (see Dixon's factorization method), first we obtain several congruences

of these, two have only small primes as factors

and a combination of these has an even power of each small prime, and is therefore a square

yielding the congruence of squares

So using the values of 80 and 114 as our x and y gives factors

See also 
Congruence relation

Equivalence (mathematics)
Integer factorization algorithms
Modular arithmetic
Squares in number theory